Chris Ryder may refer to:
 Chris Ryder (squash player)
 Chris Ryder (journalist)